The James H. and Mary B. Quello Center for Telecommunication Management & Law is a research center at Michigan State University in East Lansing, Michigan. Part of the Department of Media and Information (formerly Telecommunication, Information Studies, and Media) at the College of Communication Arts and Sciences, the Quello Center is dedicated to original research on issues of information and communication management, law and policy. It is named for former Federal Communications Commission chairman James H. Quello.

The Quello Center was founded to improve understanding of policy choices and management options affected by change in communication industries, and to help develop new alternatives. Among conducting rigorous interdisciplinary research and publication, both domestically and internationally; providing opportunities, such as symposia and conferences, to facilitate dialogue among policy makers, scholars, industry executives, and consumer interest groups; participating in other events and proceedings that evaluate important telecommunication policy developments; and providing expertise and research to policy making institutions. 
The Quello Center maintains national and international program of trans-disciplinary research addressing critical issues and serve as catalyst for the development, implementation, and evaluation of public policies and the advancement of management principles, helping to better align private sector interests with the economic and political conditions of the communications industries.

History 

The Quello Center was established in 1998 to be a worldwide focal point for excellence in research, teaching, and the development and application of expertise in telecommunication management and policy. It is named for James H. Quello, who served as Federal Communications Commission commissioner for 23 years including one year as acting chairman, and his wife Mary B. Quello (1913–1999). He married Mary in 1937. Both of them were Michigan State University undergraduate students. James Quello, policy maker and broadcasting executive, who has received many honors and awards, including the Distinguished Service Award from the National Association of Broadcasters, was inducted to the Museum of Broadcast Communications' Radio Hall of Fame in Chicago and is a member of Broadcasting/Cable Hall of Fame in New York City.

In 2014, William H. Dutton, founding director of the Oxford Internet Institute, became the director of the Quello Center. Prior to that, in August 1999, Steven S. Wildman became its first director, holding the endowed James H. Quello Chair for Telecommunication Studies, joined by Barbara A. Cherry as associate director and associate professor in the Department of Telecommunication.  In 2001, Johannes M. Bauer, joined the center.  He is professor and department chairperson in the Department of Media and Information and was named executive director in 2003. In August 2010, Jonathan A. Obar joined the center as its newest associate director, and as a visiting assistant professor in the Department of Media and Information.

Research initiatives 

Following are some of the ongoing research initiatives of the Quello Center:
 Benefits of Broadband
 Pricing of Commercial time for broadcast and commercial television
 The economics of media audience
 Dynamics of investment and innovation in wireless services
 Factors shaping diffusion of broadband in the OECD countries
 The future of broadcasting in digital environment
 Antitrust in Media and Telecommunications
 Issues of Media and Telecommunication ownership
 Content bundling for information services
 Governance of the information society
 Communication industry economics and management
 Internet industry and streaming media
 Application of complexity theory to information and communications policy
 Methods for evaluating the outcomes of legal and regulatory policy
 Spectrum Governance
 U.S. Telecommunications Policy-making
 Next-generation wireless services
 E-commerce and internet access
 New Communication Policy Paradigm
 The Governance of Social Media

People 
The Quello Center is home to leading scholars in the field of communications and telecommunications economics, technology and political economy. Among them are William H. Dutton, founding director of the Oxford Internet Institute, Steven S. Wildman, PhD. (former director), Johannes M. Bauer, PhD. (director of special programs), and Steve Lacy, PhD. (director of media studies).

Wildman, PhD in economics from Stanford, previously served as associate professor of Communication Studies and director of the Program in Telecommunications Science, Management and Policy at Northwestern University. Bauer, PhD in economics from Vienna University of Economics and Business Administration in Austria,  previously worked as director of Institute of Public Utilities and Network Industries at the Eli Broad Graduate School of Management and professor at Delft University of Technology in the Netherlands. Lacy, PhD in journalism from the University of Texas at Austin is a professor in the Michigan State University Department of Communication and School of Journalism.

Faculty associates include: Thomas F. Baldwin (senior fellow) Adam Candeub, Gary Reid, Kevin Saunders, and Peter K. Yu. Research associates include: Barbara Cherry, Wayne Fu, Robert LaRose, Hairong Li, Nora Rifon, Charles Steinfield (department chair), Carol Ting, and Pamela Whitten (Dean of College of Communication Arts and Sciences).

Research assistants include: Tithi Chattopadhyay, Sang Yup Lee, Wenjuan Ma, and Sonya Yan Song. Joy Mulvaney serves as the primary administrator of the center.

The Quello Center hosts many national and international scholars (including Fulbright program), many of them were and are involved in award-winning research. Members of advisory board in 2006 were: Rudy Baca (vice president, Precursor Group), Lauren J. “Pete” Belvin (Federal Communications Commission), Marjory Blumenthal (associate provost, Georgetown University), Rick Coy (Clark, Hill, P.L.C, John D. Evans (John D. Evans Foundation), Brian Fontes (vice president of Federal Relations, Cingular Wireless), Eddie Fritts (president and CEO, National Association of Broadcasters), Richard D. McLellan (Attorney at Law, Dykema Gossett, PLLC), Patrick J. Mullen (president, Tribune Broadcasting), Robert Pepper (chief of policy, Federal Communications Commission), James H. Quello (Wiley Rein LLP), Charles Salmon (acting dean, College of Communication Arts & Science, Michigan State University), Richard E. Wiley (Wiley Rein LLP).

Funding 
Center's activities are enabled by an endowment to which nearly 200 donors contributed. The center pursues funding from major national agencies and the private sector and conducts independent research.

Annual Quello Lecture 
 October 15, 2014 – Lisa Nakamura "Racism, Sexism, and Video Games: Social Justice Campaigns and the Struggle for Gamer Identity"
 November 4, 2013 – Alessandro Acquisti "Privacy in the Age of Augmented Reality"
 October 17, 2012 – Constance Steinkuehler "Designing and Researching Games for Impact: National Challenges, Local Initiatives”
 October 24, 2011 – Milton Mueller “Internet Freedom in the Age of Google and Facebook”

References

External links 
Quello Center Website
College of Communication Arts and Sciences
Department of Media and Information
Michigan State University

Michigan State University